'"Fantastic Voyage"' is a 1980 song by Lakeside, a band from Dayton, Ohio. It was the number one hit single from their 1980 album Fantastic Voyage. The song hit number one on the R&B chart and was the group's only entry on the Billboard Hot 100, where it peaked at number fifty-five.

Samples
In 1994, hip-hop artist Coolio sampled the Lakeside song for his own hit of the same title.

Song in popular culture
The song was performed by Cedric the Entertainer, Vanessa Williams, Bow Wow and Solange Knowles during a talent show in the movie Johnson Family Vacation. 
The song also appeared in the movie First Kid, starring Sinbad.
The song is also played in Grand Theft Auto: San Andreas, on the in-game radio station, Bounce FM.
The song was used in the Borderlands: The Pre-Sequel's Claptastic Voyage DLC trailer.  
The song was used in a television commercial in 2021 for Allstate Insurance.

References

External links
 Fantastic Voyage song lyrics at Yahoo Music

1981 singles
1980 songs
SOLAR Records singles